They're Outside is a 2020 horror movie that was directed by Sam Casserly and Airell Anthony Hayles, the latter of whom also wrote the film's script.

The film had a digital premiere at the August 2020 edition of FrightFest.

Synopsis
The film is presented as a documentary focused on an unaired episode of the YouTube show Psychology-Inside/Out, where celebrity psychologist Max Spencer diagnoses and treats patients with various mental illnesses. After filming the episode he and his girlfriend Nicole, who also served as his cameraperson, disappeared off the face of the earth.

For the episode Max had planned to focus on Sarah, a woman living near Hastings and suffering from severe agoraphobia. Max boasts that he can not only help Sarah, he can also have her leave her home in only ten days time. Once there Max and Nicole learn that Sarah believes in the local legend of Green Eyes, a practitioner of magic who would spirit people away to his home, after which they would never be seen or heard from again. Initially dismissive that the legend is real, several supernatural occurrences begin to prove Max otherwise.

Cast
 Emily Booth as Penny
 Brad Moore as Chris
 Nicholas Vince as Richard
 Jon-Paul Gates as Sarah's Husband
 Emma Burdon-Sutton as Sandra
 Chrissy Randall as Sarah
 Tom Wheatley as Max
 Nicole Miners as Nicole
 Rob Craine as Green Eyes

Production
Co-director and screenwriter Airell Anthony Hayles drew inspiration for the film's premise from several places. When he was a child he learned that his uncle had agoraphobia, which fascinated him. Hayles also wanted to write a supernatural film akin to Ghostwatch and The Sixth Sense, but had difficulty finding an idea that he liked. Other film inspirations included Picnic at Hanging Rock and the 1973 movie The Wicker Man. He came up with the idea of They're Outside after asking himself "What if a person's agoraphobia was linked to supernatural events, rather than being a purely psychological condition?" Hayles was unsatisfied with his first version of the screenplay, as he felt that it was not working and that it "did not feel right in its mood and energy for quite some time". He later re-wrote the film as found footage, stating "it found its heartbeat, and in my opinion the same story was suddenly filled with far more immediacy and energy."

Actress Emily Booth was brought on to portray the character of Penny, a role that Hayles wrote with her in mind as "Emily and I are both from Hastings where the film is set, so I knew she'd understand the vibe of the pagan community there and bring heart and a sense of fun to the role." Hayles and co-director Sam Casserly had a limited budget for the production and as a result utilized some guerrilla film making and kept the movie at a single location, Hastings, East Sussex.

Release
They're Outside premiered on 29 August 2020 at FrightFest. The event was held digitally as a result of the COVID-19 pandemic.

Reception
Common elements of praise for They're Outside focused on the acting and the film's atmosphere. Kim Newman praised the acting of Emily Booth, stating that she was "a hoot as a primary school teacher who used to be the coked-up presenter of a hot air balloon dating show called Love is in the Air". Starburst listed Chrissy Randall's character as a highlight, as they felt she "realistically conveys the struggles of an agoraphobia sufferer". Flickering Myth and Nerdly were more critical, with Flickering Myth writing that "it sometimes feels a tad sluggish and over-encumbered with melodramatic subplots, yet this is still a solid calling card for its filmmaking duo."

References

External links
 

2020 horror films
Found footage films
Films shot in East Sussex
Folk horror films
British horror films
2020s English-language films
2020s British films